Melvin Miller Rader (1903 – 14 June 1981) was a writer and professor of philosophy at the University of Washington and a civil rights advocate. He taught ethics, aesthetics and political philosophy. In the late 1940s, he was accused of being a communist by the House Un-American Activities Committee, and was later exonerated in 1951 by Attorney General, Smith Troy. Ed Guthman, a Seattle Times investigative reporter, received a Pulitzer Prize for his reporting of the events. In 2009, an endowment fund was created in Rader's name at the University of Washington to fund philosophy students engaged in social justice work.

Major works 
 (1941). The Root Values of Art. Journal of Philosophy 38 (12):324-332
 (1945). Polarity and Progress. Journal of Philosophy 42 (25):673-683.nd Society. New York: Greenwood Press.
 (1947). Isolationist and Contextualist Esthetics: Conflict and Resolution. Journal of Philosophy 44 (15):393-407.
 (1952). A Modern Book of Esthetics. New York: Holt, Rinehart and Winston. Was widely used as a standard college text in esthetics up to 5th edition (1980)
 (1953). Crisis and the Spirit of Community. Proceedings and Addresses of the American Philosophical Association 27:40 - 58.
 (1956). The Enduring Questions: Main Problems of Philosophy. New York: Holt.
 (1958). The Artist as Outsider. Journal of Aesthetics and Art Criticism 16 (3):306-318.
 (1964). Ethics and the Human Community. New York: Holt, Rinehart and Winston.
 (1972). Henry A. Alexander & Melvin Rader.  In Memoriam: Bertram Jessup. Journal of Aesthetics and Art Criticism 31 (2):149-152.
 (1973). Alienation. Social Theory and Practice 2 (3):373-379.
 (1974). Editorial. Journal of Aesthetics and Art Criticism 32 (3):319-321.
 (1974). Dickie and Socrates on Definition. Journal of Aesthetics and Art Criticism 32 (3):423-424.
 (1974). The Imaginative Mode of Awareness. Journal of Aesthetics and Art Criticism 33 (2):131-137.
 (1979) Marx's Interpretation of History: New York, Oxford University Press.
 Paul Dietrichson (1983). Melvin Rader 1903 - 1981. Proceedings and Addresses of the American Philosophical Association 56 (3):406 - 407. 
 (1981) The right to hope: crisis and community. University of Washington Press.

References

1903 births
1981 deaths
20th-century American philosophers
American philosophy academics
American political philosophers
American ethicists
Philosophers of art
University of Washington faculty